The Masked Dancer is a 1924 American silent romance film directed by Burton L. King and starring Lowell Sherman and Helene Chadwick. The film is based upon the play Die Frau mit der Maske by Rudolph Lothar.

Cast
Lowell Sherman as Prince Madhe Azhar
Helene Chadwick as Betty Powell
Leslie Austin as Robert Powell
Joe King as Fred Sinclair
Arthur Housman (uncredited)

Preservation
With no prints of The Masked Dancer located in any film archives, The Masked Dancer is a lost film. A 30-second clip of the film showing a masked woman dancing still exists.

References

External links

Glass slide at gettyimages.com

1924 films
Lost American films
American silent feature films
Films directed by Burton L. King
American films based on plays
American black-and-white films
American romance films
1920s romance films
1920s American films